Robin Anthony Herschel Waterfield (born 1952) is a British classical scholar, translator, editor, and writer of children's fiction.

Career
Waterfield was born in 1952, and studied Classics at Manchester University, where he achieved a first class degree in 1974. He went on to research ancient Greek philosophy at King's College, Cambridge until 1978, after which he became a lecturer at Newcastle University and then St Andrews University. He later became a copy-editor and later a commissioning editor for Penguin Books. He is now a self-employed writer.

Works

Translations
 Plato: Philebus (translation, introduction, notes), Penguin Books (Penguin Classics), 1982
 Plato: Theaetetus (translation, introduction, notes), Penguin Books (Penguin Classics), 1987
 Plato: Hippias Major, Hippias Minor, Euthydemus (translations, introductions, notes) in Plato: Early Socratic Dialogues (ed. T.J. Saunders), Penguin Books (Penguin Classics), 1987
 Ps.-Iamblichus: The Theology of Arithmetic (translation, introduction, notes; foreword by K. Critchlow), Phanes Press, 1988
 Xenophon: Conversations of Socrates (translations of Apology, Memorabilia, Symposium and Oeconomicus, with introductions and notes; partly a revision of earlier versions by H. Tredennick), Penguin Books (Penguin Classics), 1990
 Plutarch: Essays (translations; introductions and notes by I.G. Kidd), Penguin Books (Penguin Classics), 1992
 Epicurus: Letter on Happiness (translation and biography; introduction by J. McDade, S.J.), Rider Books, 1993 (US ed. Chronicle Books, 1996)
 Plato: Republic (translation, introduction, notes), Oxford University Press, 1993 (World's Classics, 1994; Book of the Month Club, February 1994)
 Plato: Symposium (translation, introduction, notes), Oxford University Press (World's Classics), 1994
 Plato: Gorgias (translation, introduction, notes), Oxford University Press (World's Classics), 1994
 Plato: Statesman (translation; introduction and notes by J. Annas), Cambridge University Press (Cambridge Texts in the History of Political Thought), 1995
 Aristotle: Physics (translation; introduction and notes by D. Bostock), Oxford University Press (World's Classics), 1996
 Xenophon: Hiero the Tyrant and Other Treatises (translations of Agesilaus, Hiero, Ways and Means, On Horsemanship, On Hunting and Hipparchicus; introductions and notes by P. Cartledge), Penguin Books (Penguin Classics), 1997
 Herodotus: The Histories (translation; introduction and notes by C. Dewald), Oxford University Press (Oxford World's Classics), 1998 (History Book Club, Book of the Month Club, Reader's Subscription, BCA)
 Plutarch: Greek Lives (translations; introductions and notes by P. Stadter), Oxford University Press (Oxford World's Classics), 1998
 Plutarch: Roman Lives (translations; introductions and notes by P. Stadter), Oxford University Press (Oxford World's Classics), 1999
 The First Philosophers: The Presocratics and the Sophists (translations, introductions, notes), Oxford University Press (Oxford World's Classics), 2000
 Euripides: Orestes and Other Plays (Ion, Orestes, Phoenician Women, Suppliant Women; translations; introduction by E. Hall; notes by J. Morwood), Oxford University Press (Oxford World's Classics), 2001
 Euripides: Heracles and Other Plays (Alcestis, Heracles, Heraclidae, Cyclops; translations; introduction by E. Hall; notes by J. Morwood), Oxford University Press (Oxford World's Classics), 2002
 Plato: Phaedrus (translation, introduction, notes), Oxford University Press (Oxford World's Classics), 2002
 Xenophon: The Expedition of Cyrus (translation; introduction and notes by T. Rood), Oxford University Press (Oxford World's Classics), 2005
 Plato: Timaeus and Critias (translation; introduction and notes by A. Gregory), Oxford University Press (Oxford World's Classics), 2008
 Polybius: The Histories (translation; introduction and notes by B. McGing), Oxford University Press (Oxford World's Classics), 2010
 Demosthenes: Selected Speeches (translation; introduction and notes by C. Carey), Oxford University Press (Oxford World's Classics), 2014
 Plutarch: Hellenistic Lives (translation; introduction and notes by A. Erskine), Oxford University Press (Oxford World's Classics), 2016
Aristotle: The Art of Rhetoric (translation; introduction and notes by H. Yunis), Oxford University Press (Oxford World's Classics), 2018
 Diodorus of Sicily: The Library, Books 16-20. Philip II, Alexander the Great, and the Successors (translation, introduction, notes), Oxford University Press (Oxford World's Classics, 2019
 Marcus Aurelius, Meditations: The Annotated Edition (translated and annotated), Basic Books (2021). 
 The Complete Works of Epictetus: Handbook, Discourses, and Fragments (translated, edited, introduction and notes), University of Chicago Press (2022)

General non-fiction
 Prophet: The Life and Times of Kahlil Gibran, Allen Lane, 1998 (Penguin, 1999; US ed., St Martin's Press, 1998; TSP Book Club; Italian ed., Guanda, 2000; Spanish ed., Editorial Complutense, 2000; French ed., Editions Fides-Bellarmin, 2000)
 Hidden Depths: The Story of Hypnosis, Macmillan, 2002 (Spanish ed., Debate, 2002)
 Athens: From Ancient Ideal to Modern City, Macmillan, 2003
 Xenophon's Retreat: Greece, Persia, and the End of the Golden Age, Faber and Faber/Harvard University Press, 2006
 Why Socrates Died: Dispelling the Myths, Faber and Faber/Norton/McClelland & Stewart, 2009
 Dividing the Spoils: The War for Alexander the Great's Empire, Oxford, 2011
 The Greek Myths, with Kathryn Waterfield, Quercus 2012
 Taken at the Flood: The Roman Conquest of Greece, Oxford, 2014
 Creators, Conquerors, and Citizens: A History of Ancient Greece, Oxford 2018
 The Making of a King: Antigonus Gonatas of Macedon and the Greeks, Oxford/Chicago 2021

Children's adventure gamebooks
 Rebel Planet, Puffin Books (Puffin Fighting Fantasy Gamebook 18), 1985 (French ed., Gallimard 1986; US ed., Dell 1986; computer game, Adventure Soft 1986; Japanese ed., Shakai Shiso Sha 1987; Danish ed., Borgen 1987; Portuguese ed., Verbo 1991; Brazilian Portuguese ed., Marques-Saraiva, 1992; Czech ed., Perseus 1997)
 Masks of Mayhem, Puffin Books (Puffin Fighting Fantasy Gamebook 23), 1986 (French ed., Gallimard 1987; Japanese ed., Shakai Shiso Sha 1988; Danish ed., Borgen 1988; German ed., Thienemann 1989; Hungarian ed., Taketa 1992; Portuguese ed., Verbo 1993; Hebrew ed., Opus 1993; Czech ed., Perseus, 1999)
 Phantoms of Fear, Puffin Books (Puffin Fighting Fantasy Gamebook 28), 1987 (French ed., Gallimard 1988; Danish ed., Borgen 1989; Japanese ed., Shakai Shiso Sha 1989)
 The Money Spider (with Wilfred Davies), Penguin Books (Penguin Plus), 1988 (Polish ed., eMPi2 1996)
 The Water Spider (with Wilfred Davies), Penguin Books (Penguin Plus), 1988 (Polish ed., eMPi2 1998)
 Deathmoor, Puffin Books (Puffin Fighting Fantasy Gamebook 55), 1994 (French ed., Gallimard 1996)

Academic titles
 Before Eureka: The Presocratics and Their Science, The Bristol Press, 1989 (US ed., St Martin's Press, 1989)
 Plato: Gorgias, Analysis and Commentary, Project Archelogos [e-publication], 2001

Notes

References
 Bound to Please, by Michael Dirda, W.W. Norton, 2005, pp. 5–9.

External links
 

1952 births
British classical scholars
English children's writers
British scholars of ancient Greek philosophy
Living people
Classical scholars of the University of St Andrews
Classical scholars of Newcastle University
Translators of Ancient Greek texts
English male writers